The Pittsburgh Pirates, the Major League Baseball franchise in Pittsburgh are carried on radio stations throughout four states including Pennsylvania, Ohio, West Virginia and Maryland. In 2012, KDKA-FM in Pittsburgh became the flagship station, replacing WPGB-FM., KDKA (AM) also simulcasts all weekday afternoon games as well as select other broadcasts, and serves as the backup station when 93.7 airs Pittsburgh Panthers football.

Greg Brown and Joe Block does play by play. They are joined by either Steve Blass (for home games only) or John Wehner (for all road games and some home games).

Affiliate stations

Station list

References

Pittsburgh Pirates
Major League Baseball on the radio
Sports radio networks in the United States